Burningn'n Tree is a compilation album by Squarepusher. It compiles two early EPs, namely Conumber E:P and Alroy Road Tracks, the latter having been released under the pseudonym Duke of Harringay on his independent label Spymania. Burningn'n Tree also contains three previously unreleased compositions. The album is a fusion of high speed breaks and jazz. Burningn'n Tree names all songs after their respective track index, but many of the songs were titled when released previously; those titles are parenthesized below.

Track listing

References

1997 compilation albums
Squarepusher compilation albums
Warp (record label) compilation albums